Christoph Merian (22 January 1800 – 22 August 1858) was a banker and businessman. He was the owner of a large estate, agriculturist and rentier. He was one of the richest Swiss men of that time. He was an honorary citizen of Münchenstein (1854) and the canton of Basel-Country  (1855) and the founder of the Christoph Merian Stiftung.

Early life and education
Christoph Merian was born on the 22 January 1800 in the “House to the Green Ring“ in Basel as the son of Christoph Merian senior and Valeria Hoffmann. Christoph Merian was educated in Basel. At the age of five years, his education began. He attended the private boy school of Johann Heinrich Munzinger from 1805 until 1808, the year when he entered the Gymnasium "Zur Burg". In 1811 his father bought the estate in Brüglingen, Münchenstein where the family would spend the summertime. In 1815 the family settled in Mannheim and by 1816 he began his apprenticeship as a merchant. In 1818, he began an education as an agronomist and visited the "Landwirtschaftliches Institut Hofwil" (agricultural institute of Hofwil) of Phillipp Emanuel von Fellenberg near Bern. Fellenberg was a well known principal and had several members if the European and Russian nobility among his alumni. Several young men from Basel also attended the agricultural institute.  During the year he stayed in Hofwil, he attended classes on planting, preparation of the soil, fertilizer treatment, breeding, the mechanization of agriculture and veterinary medicine. In 1819 he enrolled into the "Landwirtschaftliche Akademie" (agricultural academy) in Hohenheim by Stuttgart in 1818, where the cultivation of forests was a primary field of education. Hohenheim was a boarding school in which besides forestry also classes in mineralogy, chemistry and veterinary medicine were included in the curriculum and the students were free to attend the classes they wanted to.  He stayed in Hohenheim until 1821 following which he accompanied Theodor von Speyr, a merchant in his fathers service on a journey over London, Liverpool and Dover in England and Calais and Paris in France.

Professional career 
He lived as a banker, businessman and agriculturist on the farming estate of Brüglingen in Münchenstein near Basel. He achieved large financial gains with his firm "Frères Merian" in by-passing the Napoleonic Continental System.

Legacy 
Today, he is remembered mainly for founding the Christoph Merian Stiftung, a highly visible non-profit entity that continues to support social, cultural, ecological and economic projects to the benefit of the general population in the Basel region to this day. As of 2006, its worth was 289 million Swiss Francs, in addition to the 900 ha of land it owns. The institution was founded in Christoph Merian's Testament (dated 26.03.1857), in which he made an endowment/beneficence to the city of Basel. This came into legal effect when his widow Margaretha (1806-1886) died on 3 May 1886. He and his wife are buried in the Elisabethenkirche, whose construction he encouraged and also financed.

Family 
He stemmed from the Merian family, one of the most distinguished aristocrat families in Basel.  In 1824 he married Margarethe Burckhardt, the daughter of an industrial. As a wedding present, they received the country estate in Brüglingen and the country house Villa Merian. His father, Christoph Merian senior, was a merchant who started with handling raw cotton, later with shipping/transport, banking and various speculative businesses. Christoph Merian senior ended his venturous businesses in 1810 and subsequently invested in the industry and banking activities.

References

Literature
Gustav Adolf Wanner: Christoph Merian, Basel, 1958
Rudolf Suter: Die Christoph Merian Stiftung, Basel, 1986

External links 
Personenlexikon des Kantons Basel-Landschaft: Merian Christoph: available in archive.org 
Christoph Merian Stiftung: http://www.merianstiftung.ch 
Merian Park Brüglingen: https://web.archive.org/web/20120714232526/http://www.bogabrueglingen.ch/ 

Münchenstein
Businesspeople from Basel-Stadt
1800 births
1858 deaths
Swiss bankers
Christoph
19th-century Swiss businesspeople